Bob Dylan (legally Robert Dylan, born Robert Allen Zimmerman, May 24, 1941) is an American singer-songwriter. Often regarded as one of the greatest songwriters of all time, Dylan has been a major figure in popular culture during a career spanning more than 60 years. Much of his most celebrated work dates from the 1960s, when songs such as "Blowin' in the Wind" (1963) and "The Times They Are a-Changin' (1964) became anthems for the civil rights and antiwar movements. His lyrics during this period incorporated a range of political, social, philosophical, and literary influences, defying pop music conventions and appealing to the burgeoning counterculture.

Following his self-titled debut album in 1962, which comprised mainly traditional folk songs, Dylan made his breakthrough as a songwriter with the release of The Freewheelin' Bob Dylan the following year. The album features "Blowin' in the Wind" and the thematically complex "A Hard Rain's a-Gonna Fall". Many of his songs adapted the tunes and phraseology of older folk songs. He went on to release the politically charged The Times They Are a-Changin' and the more lyrically abstract and introspective Another Side of Bob Dylan in 1964. In 1965 and 1966, Dylan drew controversy among folk purists when he adopted electrically amplified rock instrumentation, and in the space of 15 months recorded three of the most important and influential rock albums of the 1960s: Bringing It All Back Home, Highway 61 Revisited (both 1965) and Blonde on Blonde (1966). His six-minute single "Like a Rolling Stone" (1965) expanded commercial and creative boundaries in popular music.

In July 1966, a motorcycle accident led to Dylan's withdrawal from touring. During this period, he recorded a large body of songs with members of the Band, who had previously backed him on tour. These recordings were released as the collaborative album The Basement Tapes in 1975. In the late 1960s and early 1970s, Dylan explored country music and rural themes in John Wesley Harding (1967), Nashville Skyline (1969), and New Morning (1970). In 1975, he released Blood on the Tracks, which many saw as a return to form. In the late 1970s, he became a born-again Christian and released a series of albums of contemporary gospel music before returning to his more familiar rock-based idiom in the early 1980s. Dylan's 1997 album Time Out of Mind marked the beginning of a renaissance for his career. He has released five critically acclaimed albums of original material since then, the most recent being Rough and Rowdy Ways (2020). He also recorded a series of three albums in the 2010s comprising versions of traditional American standards, especially songs recorded by Frank Sinatra. Dylan has toured continuously since the late 1980s on what has become known as the Never Ending Tour.

Since 1994, Dylan has published nine books of drawings and paintings, and his work has been exhibited in major art galleries. He has sold more than 125 million records, making him one of the best-selling musicians of all time. He has received numerous awards, including the Presidential Medal of Freedom, ten Grammy Awards, a Golden Globe Award and an Academy Award. Dylan has been inducted into the Rock and Roll Hall of Fame, Nashville Songwriters Hall of Fame and the Songwriters Hall of Fame. The Pulitzer Prize Board in 2008 awarded him a special citation for "his profound impact on popular music and American culture, marked by lyrical compositions of extraordinary poetic power". In 2016, Dylan was awarded the Nobel Prize in Literature "for having created new poetic expressions within the great American song tradition".

Life and career

1941–1959: Origins and musical beginnings

Bob Dylan was born Robert Allen Zimmerman ( Shabtai Zisl ben Avraham) in St. Mary's Hospital on May 24, 1941, in Duluth, Minnesota, and raised in Hibbing, Minnesota, on the Mesabi Range west of Lake Superior. Dylan's paternal grandparents, Anna Kirghiz and Zigman Zimmerman, emigrated from Odesa in the Russian Empire (now Ukraine) to the United States, following the pogroms against Jews of 1905. His maternal grandparents, Florence and Ben Stone, were Lithuanian Jews who had arrived in the United States in 1902. In his autobiography, Chronicles: Volume One, Dylan wrote that his paternal grandmother's family was originally from the Kağızman district of Kars Province in northeastern Turkey.

Dylan's father Abram Zimmerman and his mother Beatrice "Beatty" Stone were part of a small, close-knit Jewish community. They lived in Duluth until Dylan was six, when his father contracted polio and the family returned to his mother's hometown, Hibbing, where they lived for the rest of Dylan's childhood, and his father and paternal uncles ran a furniture and appliance store. In his early years he listened to the radio—first to blues and country stations from Shreveport, Louisiana, and later, when he was a teenager, to rock and roll.

Dylan formed several bands while attending Hibbing High School. In the Golden Chords, he performed covers of songs by Little Richard and Elvis Presley. Their performance of Danny & the Juniors' "Rock and Roll Is Here to Stay" at their high school talent show was so loud that the principal cut the microphone. In 1959, Dylan's high school yearbook carried the caption "Robert Zimmerman: to join 'Little Richard. That year, as Elston Gunnn, he performed two dates with Bobby Vee, playing piano and clapping. In September 1959, Dylan moved to Minneapolis and enrolled at the University of Minnesota. His focus on rock and roll gave way to American folk music, as he explained in a 1985 interview:

Living at the Jewish-centric fraternity Sigma Alpha Mu house, Dylan began to perform at the Ten O'Clock Scholar, a coffeehouse a few blocks from campus, and became involved in the Dinkytown folk music circuit. During this period, he began to introduce himself as "Bob Dylan". In his memoir, he wrote that he considered adopting the surname Dillon before unexpectedly seeing poems by Dylan Thomas, and deciding upon that less common variant. Explaining his change of name in a 2004 interview, he said, "You're born, you know, the wrong names, wrong parents. I mean, that happens. You call yourself what you want to call yourself. This is the land of the free."

1960s

Relocation to New York and record deal
In May 1960, Dylan dropped out of college at the end of his first year. In January 1961, he traveled to New York City to perform there and visit his musical idol Woody Guthrie, who was seriously ill with Huntington's disease in Greystone Park Psychiatric Hospital. Guthrie had been a revelation to Dylan and influenced his early performances. Describing Guthrie's impact, he wrote: "The songs themselves had the infinite sweep of humanity in them... [He] was the true voice of the American spirit. I said to myself I was going to be Guthrie's greatest disciple". As well as visiting Guthrie in hospital, Dylan befriended Guthrie's protégé Ramblin' Jack Elliott. Much of Guthrie's repertoire was channeled through Elliott, and Dylan paid tribute to Elliott in Chronicles: Volume One. Dylan later said he was influenced by African-American poets he heard on the New York streets, especially Big Brown.

From February 1961, Dylan played at clubs around Greenwich Village, befriending and picking up material from folk singers there, including Dave Van Ronk, Fred Neil, Odetta, the New Lost City Ramblers and Irish musicians the Clancy Brothers and Tommy Makem. He often accompanied other musicians on harmonica, which led to Dylan filling in for the ailing Sonny Terry on Harry Belafonte's 1962 album Midnight Special. Dylan later described this session as "my professional recording debut." In September, The New York Times critic Robert Shelton boosted Dylan's career with a very enthusiastic review of his performance at Gerde's Folk City: "Bob Dylan: A Distinctive Folk-Song Stylist". That month, Dylan played harmonica on folk singer Carolyn Hester's third album, bringing him to the attention of the album's producer John Hammond, who signed Dylan to Columbia Records. Dylan's first album, Bob Dylan, released March 19, 1962, consisted of familiar folk, blues and gospel with just two original compositions. The album sold 5,000 copies in its first year, just enough to break even.

 In August 1962, Dylan took two decisive steps in his career. He changed his name to Bob Dylan, and he signed a management contract with Albert Grossman. Grossman remained Dylan's manager until 1970, and was known for his sometimes confrontational personality and protective loyalty. Dylan said, "He was kind of like a Colonel Tom Parker figure ... you could smell him coming." Tension between Grossman and John Hammond led to the latter suggesting Dylan work with the young African-American jazz producer Tom Wilson, who produced several tracks for the second album without formal credit. Wilson produced the next three albums Dylan recorded.

Dylan made his first trip to the United Kingdom from December 1962 to January 1963. He had been invited by television director Philip Saville to appear in a drama, Madhouse on Castle Street, which Saville was directing for BBC Television. At the end of the play, Dylan performed "Blowin' in the Wind", one of its first public performances. While in London, Dylan performed at London folk clubs, including the Troubadour, Les Cousins, and Bunjies. He also learned material from UK performers, including Martin Carthy.

By the release of Dylan's second album, The Freewheelin' Bob Dylan, in May 1963, he had begun to make his name as a singer-songwriter. Many songs on the album were labeled protest songs, inspired partly by Guthrie and influenced by Pete Seeger's passion for topical songs. "Oxford Town" was an account of James Meredith's ordeal as the first black student to risk enrollment at the University of Mississippi. The first song on the album, "Blowin' in the Wind", partly derived its melody from the traditional slave song, "No More Auction Block", while its lyrics questioned the social and political status quo. The song was widely recorded by other artists and became a hit for Peter, Paul and Mary. Another song, "A Hard Rain's a-Gonna Fall", was based on the folk ballad "Lord Randall". With veiled references to an impending apocalypse, it gained resonance when the Cuban Missile Crisis developed a few weeks after Dylan began performing it. Like "Blowin' in the Wind", "A Hard Rain's a-Gonna Fall" marked a new direction in songwriting, blending a stream-of-consciousness, imagist lyrical attack with traditional folk form.

Dylan's topical songs led to his being viewed as more than just a songwriter. Janet Maslin wrote of Freewheelin: "These were the songs that established [Dylan] as the voice of his generation—someone who implicitly understood how concerned young Americans felt about nuclear disarmament and the growing Civil Rights Movement: his mixture of moral authority and nonconformity was perhaps the most timely of his attributes." Freewheelin also included love songs and surreal talking blues. Humor was an important part of Dylan's persona, and the range of material on the album impressed listeners, including the Beatles. George Harrison said of the album: "We just played it, just wore it out. The content of the song lyrics and just the attitude—it was incredibly original and wonderful".

The rough edge of Dylan's singing unsettled some but was an attraction to others. Novelist Joyce Carol Oates wrote: "When we first heard this raw, very young, and seemingly untrained voice, frankly nasal, as if sandpaper could sing, the effect was dramatic and electrifying". Many early songs reached the public through more palatable versions by other performers, such as Joan Baez, who became Dylan's advocate and lover. Baez was influential in bringing Dylan to prominence by recording several of his early songs and inviting him on stage during her concerts. Others who had hits with Dylan's songs in the early 1960s included the Byrds, Sonny & Cher, the Hollies, Peter, Paul and Mary, the Association, Manfred Mann and the Turtles.

"Mixed-Up Confusion", recorded during the Freewheelin''' sessions with a backing band, was released as Dylan's first single in December 1962, but then swiftly withdrawn. In contrast to the mostly solo acoustic performances on the album, the single showed a willingness to experiment with a rockabilly sound. Cameron Crowe described it as "a fascinating look at a folk artist with his mind wandering towards Elvis Presley and Sun Records".

Protest and Another Side

In May 1963, Dylan's political profile rose when he walked out of The Ed Sullivan Show. During rehearsals, Dylan had been told by CBS television's head of program practices that "Talkin' John Birch Paranoid Blues" was potentially libelous to the John Birch Society. Rather than comply with censorship, Dylan refused to appear.

By this time, Dylan and Baez were prominent in the civil rights movement, singing together at the March on Washington on August 28, 1963. Dylan's third album, The Times They Are a-Changin', reflected a more politicized Dylan. The songs often took as their subject matter contemporary stories, with "Only a Pawn in Their Game" addressing the murder of civil rights worker Medgar Evers; and the Brechtian "The Lonesome Death of Hattie Carroll" the death of black hotel barmaid Hattie Carroll, at the hands of young white socialite William Zantzinger. On a more general theme, "Ballad of Hollis Brown" and "North Country Blues" addressed despair engendered by the breakdown of farming and mining communities. This political material was accompanied by two personal love songs, "Boots of Spanish Leather" and "One Too Many Mornings".

By the end of 1963, Dylan felt both manipulated and constrained by the folk and protest movements. Accepting the "Tom Paine Award" from the National Emergency Civil Liberties Committee shortly after the assassination of John F. Kennedy, an intoxicated Dylan questioned the role of the committee, characterized the members as old and balding, and claimed to see something of himself and of every man in Kennedy's assassin, Lee Harvey Oswald.Another Side of Bob Dylan, recorded in a single evening on June 9, 1964, had a lighter mood. The humorous Dylan reemerged on "I Shall Be Free No. 10" and "Motorpsycho Nightmare". "Spanish Harlem Incident" and "To Ramona" are passionate love songs, while "Black Crow Blues" and "I Don't Believe You (She Acts Like We Never Have Met)" suggest the rock and roll soon to dominate Dylan's music. "It Ain't Me Babe", on the surface a song about spurned love, has been described as a rejection of the role of political spokesman thrust upon him. His newest direction was signaled by two lengthy songs: the impressionistic "Chimes of Freedom", which sets social commentary against a metaphorical landscape in a style characterized by Allen Ginsberg as "chains of flashing images," and "My Back Pages", which attacks the simplistic and arch seriousness of his own earlier topical songs and seems to predict the backlash he was about to encounter from his former champions as he took a new direction.

In the latter half of 1964 and into 1965, Dylan moved from folk songwriter to folk-rock pop-music star. His jeans and work shirts were replaced by a Carnaby Street wardrobe, sunglasses day or night, and pointed "Beatle boots". A London reporter wrote: "Hair that would set the teeth of a comb on edge. A loud shirt that would dim the neon lights of Leicester Square. He looks like an undernourished cockatoo." Dylan began to spar with interviewers. Appearing on the Les Crane television show and asked about a movie he planned, he told Crane it would be a cowboy horror movie. Asked if he played the cowboy, Dylan replied, "No, I play my mother".

Going electric

 Dylan's late March 1965 album Bringing It All Back Home was another leap, featuring his first recordings with electric instruments, under producer Tom Wilson's guidance. The first single, "Subterranean Homesick Blues", owed much to Chuck Berry's "Too Much Monkey Business"; its free-association lyrics described as harking back to the energy of beat poetry and as a forerunner of rap and hip-hop. The song was provided with an early music video, which opened D. A. Pennebaker's cinéma vérité presentation of Dylan's 1965 tour of Great Britain, Dont Look Back. Instead of miming, Dylan illustrated the lyrics by throwing cue cards containing key words from the song on the ground. Pennebaker said the sequence was Dylan's idea, and it has been imitated in music videos and advertisements.

The second side of Bringing It All Back Home contained four long songs on which Dylan accompanied himself on acoustic guitar and harmonica. "Mr. Tambourine Man" became one of his best-known songs when the Byrds recorded an electric version that reached number one in the US and UK. "It's All Over Now, Baby Blue" and "It's Alright Ma (I'm Only Bleeding)" were two of Dylan's most important compositions.Shelton, pp. 276–277.

In 1965, headlining the Newport Folk Festival, Dylan performed his first electric set since high school with a pickup group featuring Mike Bloomfield on guitar and Al Kooper on organ. Dylan had appeared at Newport in 1963 and 1964, but in 1965 met with cheering and booing and left the stage after three songs. One version has it that the boos were from folk fans whom Dylan had alienated by appearing, unexpectedly, with an electric guitar. Murray Lerner, who filmed the performance, said: "I absolutely think that they were booing Dylan going electric." An alternative account claims audience members were upset by poor sound and a short set.

Nevertheless, Dylan's performance provoked a hostile response from the folk music establishment.A year earlier, Irwin Silber, editor of Sing Out!, had published an "Open Letter to Bob Dylan", criticizing Dylan's stepping away from political songwriting: "I saw at Newport how you had somehow lost contact with people. Some of the paraphernalia of fame were getting in your way." Sing Out!, November 1964, quoted in Shelton, p. 313. This letter has been mistakenly described as a response to Dylan's 1965 Newport appearance. In the September issue of Sing Out!, Ewan MacColl wrote: "Our traditional songs and ballads are the creations of extraordinarily talented artists working inside disciplines formulated over time ...'But what of Bobby Dylan?' scream the outraged teenagers ... Only a completely non-critical audience, nourished on the watery pap of pop music, could have fallen for such tenth-rate drivel". On July 29, four days after Newport, Dylan was back in the studio in New York, recording "Positively 4th Street". The lyrics contained images of vengeance and paranoia, and have been interpreted as Dylan's put-down of former friends from the folk community he had known in clubs along West 4th Street.

Highway 61 Revisited and Blonde on Blonde

In July 1965, Dylan's six-minute single "Like a Rolling Stone" peaked at number two in the US chart. In 2004 and in 2011, Rolling Stone listed it as number one of "The 500 Greatest Songs of All Time". Bruce Springsteen, in his speech for Dylan's inauguration into the Rock and Roll Hall of Fame, said that on first hearing the single, "that snare shot sounded like somebody'd kicked open the door to your mind." The song opened Dylan's next album, Highway 61 Revisited, named after the road that led from Dylan's Minnesota to the musical hotbed of New Orleans. The songs were in the same vein as the hit single, flavored by Mike Bloomfield's blues guitar and Al Kooper's organ riffs. "Desolation Row", backed by acoustic guitar and understated bass, offers the sole exception, with Dylan alluding to figures in Western culture in a song described by Andy Gill as "an 11-minute epic of entropy, which takes the form of a Fellini-esque parade of grotesques and oddities featuring a huge cast of celebrated characters, some historical (Einstein, Nero), some biblical (Noah, Cain and Abel), some fictional (Ophelia, Romeo, Cinderella), some literary (T. S. Eliot and Ezra Pound), and some who fit into none of the above categories, notably Dr. Filth and his dubious nurse".

In support of the album, Dylan was booked for two US concerts with Al Kooper and Harvey Brooks from his studio crew and Robbie Robertson and Levon Helm, former members of Ronnie Hawkins's backing band the Hawks. On August 28 at Forest Hills Tennis Stadium, the group was heckled by an audience still annoyed by Dylan's electric sound. The band's reception on September 3 at the Hollywood Bowl was more favorable.

From September 24, 1965, in Austin, Texas, Dylan toured the US and Canada for six months, backed by the five musicians from the Hawks who became known as The Band. While Dylan and the Hawks met increasingly receptive audiences, their studio efforts foundered. Producer Bob Johnston persuaded Dylan to record in Nashville in February 1966, and surrounded him with top-notch session men. At Dylan's insistence, Robertson and Kooper came from New York City to play on the sessions. The Nashville sessions produced the double album Blonde on Blonde (1966), featuring what Dylan called "that thin wild mercury sound". Kooper described it as "taking two cultures and smashing them together with a huge explosion": the musical world of Nashville and the world of the "quintessential New York hipster" Bob Dylan.

On November 22, 1965, Dylan quietly married 25-year-old former model Sara Lownds. Some of Dylan's friends, including Ramblin' Jack Elliott, say that, immediately after the event, Dylan denied he was married. Journalist Nora Ephron made the news public in the New York Post in February 1966 with the headline "Hush! Bob Dylan is wed".

Dylan toured Australia and Europe in April and May 1966. Each show was split in two. Dylan performed solo during the first half, accompanying himself on acoustic guitar and harmonica. In the second, backed by the Hawks, he played electrically amplified music. This contrast provoked many fans, who jeered and slow handclapped. The tour culminated in a raucous confrontation between Dylan and his audience at the Manchester Free Trade Hall in England on May 17, 1966. A recording of this concert was released in 1998: The Bootleg Series Vol. 4: Bob Dylan Live 1966. At the climax of the evening, a member of the audience, angered by Dylan's electric backing, shouted: "Judas!" to which Dylan responded, "I don't believe you ... You're a liar!" Dylan turned to his band and said, "Play it fucking loud!" as they launched into the final song of the night—"Like a Rolling Stone".

During his 1966 tour, Dylan was described as exhausted and acting "as if on a death trip". D. A. Pennebaker, the filmmaker accompanying the tour, described Dylan as "taking a lot of amphetamine and who-knows-what-else". In a 1969 interview with Jann Wenner, Dylan said, "I was on the road for almost five years. It wore me down. I was on drugs, a lot of things ... just to keep going, you know?"

Motorcycle accident and reclusion
On July 29, 1966, Dylan crashed his motorcycle, a Triumph Tiger 100, near his home in Woodstock, New York. Dylan said he broke several vertebrae in his neck. Mystery still surrounds the circumstances of the accident since no ambulance was called to the scene and Dylan was not hospitalized. Dylan's biographers have written that the crash offered him the chance to escape the pressures around him.Heylin (2000), p. 268. Dylan concurred in his autobiography Chronicles: "I had been in a motorcycle accident and I'd been hurt, but I recovered. Truth was that I wanted to get out of the rat race." He made very few public appearances, and did not tour again for almost eight years.Heylin (1996), p. 143.

Once Dylan was well enough to resume creative work, he began to edit D. A. Pennebaker's film of his 1966 tour. A rough cut was shown to ABC Television, but they rejected it as incomprehensible to mainstream audiences. The film, titled Eat the Document on bootleg copies, has since been screened at a handful of film festivals. In 1967, secluded from public gaze, Dylan recorded over 100 songs at his Woodstock home and in the basement of the Hawks' nearby house, "Big Pink". These songs were initially offered as demos for other artists to record and were first heard in the shape of hits for Julie Driscoll, the Byrds, and Manfred Mann. Columbia released a selection in 1975 as The Basement Tapes double album. Other songs recorded by Dylan and his band in 1967 appeared piecemeal on bootleg recordings, but they were not released in their entirety until 2014 as The Basement Tapes Complete.

In the fall of 1967, Dylan returned to studio recording in Nashville, accompanied by Charlie McCoy on bass, Kenny Buttrey on drums and Pete Drake on steel guitar. The result was John Wesley Harding, a record of short songs thematically drawing on the American West and the Bible. The sparse structure and instrumentation, with lyrics that took the Judeo-Christian tradition seriously, was a departure from Dylan's previous work. It included "All Along the Watchtower".Later recorded by Jimi Hendrix, whose version Dylan acknowledged as definitive. Woody Guthrie died in October 1967, and Dylan made his first live appearance in twenty months at a memorial concert held at Carnegie Hall on January 20, 1968, where he was backed by the Band.

Dylan's next release, Nashville Skyline (1969) featured Nashville musicians, a mellow-voiced Dylan, a duet with Johnny Cash, and the single "Lay Lady Lay". Variety wrote, "Dylan is definitely doing something that can be called singing. Somehow he has managed to add an octave to his range." During one recording session, Dylan and Cash recorded a series of duets, but only their version of Dylan's "Girl from the North Country" was released on the album.

In May 1969, Dylan appeared on the first episode of Johnny Cash's television show and sang a duet with Cash of "Girl from the North Country", with solos of "Living the Blues" and "I Threw It All Away". Dylan next traveled to England to top the bill at the Isle of Wight festival on August 31, 1969, after rejecting overtures to appear at the Woodstock Festival closer to his home.

1970s
In the early 1970s, critics charged that Dylan's output was varied and unpredictable. Rolling Stone writer Greil Marcus asked, "What is this shit?" on first listening to Self Portrait, released in June 1970. It was a double LP including few original songs and was poorly received. In October 1970, Dylan released New Morning, considered a return to form. This album included "Day of the Locusts", a song in which Dylan gave an account of receiving an honorary degree from Princeton University on June 9, 1970. In November 1968, Dylan had co-written "I'd Have You Anytime" with George Harrison; Harrison recorded "I'd Have You Anytime" and Dylan's "If Not for You" for his 1970 solo triple album All Things Must Pass. Dylan's surprise appearance at Harrison's 1971 Concert for Bangladesh attracted media coverage, since Dylan's live appearances had become rare.

Between March 16 and 19, 1971, Dylan reserved three days at Blue Rock, a small studio in Greenwich Village, to record with Leon Russell. These sessions resulted in "Watching the River Flow" and a new recording of "When I Paint My Masterpiece". On November 4, 1971, Dylan recorded "George Jackson", which he released a week later. For many, the single was a surprising return to protest material, mourning the killing of Black Panther George Jackson in San Quentin State Prison that year. Dylan contributed piano and harmony to Steve Goodman's album, Somebody Else's Troubles, under the pseudonym Robert Milkwood Thomas (referencing Under Milk Wood by Dylan Thomas and his own previous name) in September 1972.

In 1972, Dylan signed to Sam Peckinpah's film Pat Garrett and Billy the Kid, providing songs and backing music for the movie, and playing "Alias", a member of Billy's gang with some historical basis. Despite the film's failure at the box office, the song "Knockin' on Heaven's Door" became one of Dylan's most covered songs.Artists to have covered the song include Bryan Ferry, Wyclef Jean and Guns N' Roses. 

Also in 1972, Dylan protested the move to deport John Lennon and Yoko Ono, who had been convicted of possessing cannabis, by sending a letter to the US Immigration Service, in part: "Hurray for John & Yoko. Let them stay and live here and breathe. The country's got plenty of room and space. Let John and Yoko stay!"

Return to touring

Dylan began 1973 by signing with a new label, David Geffen's Asylum Records, when his contract with Columbia Records expired. His next album, Planet Waves, was recorded in the fall of 1973, using the Band as his backing group as they rehearsed for a major tour. The album included two versions of "Forever Young", which became one of his most popular songs. As one critic described it, the song projected "something hymnal and heartfelt that spoke of the father in Dylan", and Dylan himself commented: "I wrote it thinking about one of my boys and not wanting to be too sentimental". Columbia Records simultaneously released Dylan, a collection of studio outtakes, widely interpreted as a churlish response to Dylan's signing with a rival record label.

In January 1974, Dylan, backed by the Band, embarked on a North American tour of 40 concerts—his first tour for seven years. A live double album, Before the Flood, was released on Asylum Records. Soon, according to Clive Davis, Columbia Records sent word they "will spare nothing to bring Dylan back into the fold". Dylan had second thoughts about Asylum, unhappy that Geffen had sold only 600,000 copies of Planet Waves despite millions of unfulfilled ticket requests for the 1974 tour; he returned to Columbia Records, which reissued his two Asylum albums.

After the tour, Dylan and his wife became estranged. He filled three small notebooks with songs about relationships and ruptures, and recorded the album Blood on the Tracks in September 1974. Dylan delayed the album's release and re-recorded half the songs at Sound 80 Studios in Minneapolis with production assistance from his brother, David Zimmerman.

Released in early 1975, Blood on the Tracks received mixed reviews. In the NME, Nick Kent described the "accompaniments" as "often so trashy they sound like mere practice takes". In Rolling Stone, Jon Landau wrote that "the record has been made with typical shoddiness." Over the years critics came to see it as one of Dylan's greatest achievements. For the Salon website, journalist Bill Wyman wrote: "Blood on the Tracks is his only flawless album and his best produced; the songs, each of them, are constructed in disciplined fashion. It is his kindest album and most dismayed, and seems in hindsight to have achieved a sublime balance between the logorrhea-plagued excesses of his mid-1960s output and the self-consciously simple compositions of his post-accident years".

In the middle of that year, Dylan championed boxer Rubin "Hurricane" Carter, imprisoned for a triple murder in Paterson, New Jersey, with his ballad "Hurricane" making the case for Carter's innocence. Despite its length—over eight minutes—the song was released as a single, peaking at 33 on the US Billboard chart, and performed at every 1975 date of Dylan's next tour, the Rolling Thunder Revue. The tour featured about one hundred performers and supporters from the Greenwich Village folk scene, including T-Bone Burnett, Ramblin' Jack Elliott, Joni Mitchell, David Mansfield, Roger McGuinn, Mick Ronson, Joan Baez and Scarlet Rivera, whom Dylan discovered walking down the street, her violin case on her back.

Running through late 1975 and again through early 1976, the tour encompassed the release of the album Desire, with many of Dylan's new songs featuring a travelogue-like narrative style, showing the influence of his new collaborator, playwright Jacques Levy.Gray (2006), p. 408. The 1976 half of the tour was documented by a TV concert special, Hard Rain, and the LP Hard Rain.

The 1975 tour with the Revue provided the backdrop to Dylan's nearly four-hour film Renaldo and Clara, a sprawling narrative mixed with concert footage and reminiscences. Released in 1978, the movie received poor, sometimes scathing, reviews.Sounes, p. 313. Later in that year, a two-hour edit, dominated by the concert performances, was more widely released. More than forty years later, a documentary about the 1975 leg of the Rolling Thunder Revue, Rolling Thunder Revue: A Bob Dylan Story by Martin Scorsese was released by Netflix on June 12, 2019.

In November 1976, Dylan appeared at the Band's "farewell" concert, with Eric Clapton, Joni Mitchell, Muddy Waters, Van Morrison and Neil Young. Martin Scorsese's 1978 cinematic chronicle of the concert, The Last Waltz, included most of Dylan's set.

In 1978, Dylan embarked on a year-long world tour, performing 114 shows in Japan, the Far East, Europe and North America, to a total audience of two million. Dylan assembled an eight-piece band and three backing singers. Concerts in Tokyo in February and March were released as the live double album Bob Dylan at Budokan. Reviews were mixed. Robert Christgau awarded the album a C+ rating, giving the album a derisory review, while Janet Maslin defended it in Rolling Stone, writing: "These latest live versions of his old songs have the effect of liberating Bob Dylan from the originals". When Dylan brought the tour to the US in September 1978, the press described the look and sound as a "Las Vegas Tour". The 1978 tour grossed more than $20 million, and Dylan told the Los Angeles Times that he had debts because "I had a couple of bad years. I put a lot of money into the movie, built a big house  ... and it costs a lot to get divorced in California".

In April and May 1978, Dylan took the same band and vocalists into Rundown Studios in Santa Monica, California, to record an album of new material: Street-Legal. It was described by Michael Gray as, "after Blood On The Tracks, arguably Dylan's best record of the 1970s: a crucial album documenting a crucial period in Dylan's own life". However, it had poor sound and mixing (attributed to Dylan's studio practices), muddying the instrumental detail until a remastered CD release in 1999 restored some of the songs' strengths.Barker (2019), Bob Dylan Anthology, Volume 3. p. 357.

Christian period

In the late 1970s, Dylan converted to Evangelical Christianity, undertaking a three-month discipleship course run by the Association of Vineyard Churches.Dylan Interview with Karen Hughes, The Dominion, Wellington, New Zealand, May 21, 1980; reprinted in Cott (ed.), Dylan on Dylan: The Essential Interviews, pp. 275–278 He released three albums of contemporary gospel music. Slow Train Coming (1979) featured Dire Straits guitarist Mark Knopfler and was produced by veteran R&B producer Jerry Wexler. Wexler said that Dylan had tried to evangelize him during the recording. He replied: "Bob, you're dealing with a 62-year-old Jewish atheist. Let's just make an album." Dylan won the Grammy Award for Best Male Rock Vocal Performance for the song "Gotta Serve Somebody". His second Christian album, Saved (1980), received mixed reviews, described by Michael Gray as "the nearest thing to a follow-up album Dylan has ever made, Slow Train Coming II and inferior". His third Christian album was Shot of Love in 1981. When touring in late 1979 and early 1980, Dylan would not play his older, secular works, and he delivered declarations of his faith from the stage, such as:

Dylan's Christianity was unpopular with some fans and musicians. John Lennon, shortly before being murdered, recorded "Serve Yourself" in response to Dylan's "Gotta Serve Somebody". By 1981, Stephen Holden wrote in The New York Times that "neither age (he's now 40) nor his much-publicized conversion to born-again Christianity has altered his essentially iconoclastic temperament".

1980s
In late 1980, Dylan briefly played concerts billed as "A Musical Retrospective", restoring popular 1960s songs to the repertoire. Shot of Love, recorded early the next year, featured his first secular compositions in more than two years, mixed with Christian songs. The lyrics of "Every Grain of Sand" resemble the verse of William Blake.

In the 1980s, reception of Dylan's recordings varied, from the well-regarded Infidels in 1983 to the panned Down in the Groove in 1988. Michael Gray condemned Dylan's 1980s albums for carelessness in the studio and for failing to release his best songs. As an example of the latter, the Infidels recording sessions, which again employed Knopfler on lead guitar and also as the album's producer, resulted in several songs that Dylan left off the album. Best regarded of these were "Blind Willie McTell", a tribute to the dead blues musician and an evocation of African American history, "Foot of Pride" and "Lord Protect My Child". These three songs were released on The Bootleg Series Volumes 1–3 (Rare & Unreleased) 1961–1991.

Between July 1984 and March 1985, Dylan recorded Empire Burlesque. Arthur Baker, who had remixed hits for Bruce Springsteen and Cyndi Lauper, was asked to engineer and mix the album. Baker said he felt he was hired to make Dylan's album sound "a little bit more contemporary".

In 1985 Dylan sang on USA for Africa's famine relief single "We Are the World". He also joined Artists United Against Apartheid providing vocals for their single "Sun City". On July 13, 1985, he appeared at the climax at the Live Aid concert at JFK Stadium, Philadelphia. Backed by Keith Richards and Ronnie Wood, he performed a ragged version of "Hollis Brown", his ballad of rural poverty, and then said to the worldwide audience exceeding one billion people: "I hope that some of the money ... maybe they can just take a little bit of it, maybe ... one or two million, maybe ... and use it to pay the mortgages on some of the farms and, the farmers here, owe to the banks". His remarks were widely criticized as inappropriate, but they did inspire Willie Nelson to organize a series of events, Farm Aid, to benefit debt-ridden American farmers.

In April 1986, Dylan made a foray into rap music when he added vocals to the opening verse of "Street Rock", featured on Kurtis Blow's album Kingdom Blow. Dylan's next studio album, Knocked Out Loaded, in July 1986 contained three covers (by Little Junior Parker, Kris Kristofferson and the gospel hymn "Precious Memories"), plus three collaborations (with Tom Petty, Sam Shepard and Carole Bayer Sager), and two solo compositions by Dylan. One reviewer commented that "the record follows too many detours to be consistently compelling, and some of those detours wind down roads that are indisputably dead ends. By 1986, such uneven records weren't entirely unexpected by Dylan, but that didn't make them any less frustrating." It was the first Dylan album since his 1962 debut to fail to make the Top 50. Since then, some critics have called the 11-minute epic that Dylan co-wrote with Sam Shepard, "Brownsville Girl", a work of genius.

In 1986 and 1987, Dylan toured with Tom Petty and the Heartbreakers, sharing vocals with Petty on several songs each night. Dylan also toured with the Grateful Dead in 1987, resulting in a live album Dylan & The Dead. This received negative reviews; AllMusic said it was "quite possibly the worst album by either Bob Dylan or the Grateful Dead". Dylan then initiated what came to be called the Never Ending Tour on June 7, 1988, performing with a back-up band featuring guitarist G. E. Smith. Dylan would continue to tour with a small, changing band for the next 30 years.

In 1987, Dylan starred in Richard Marquand's movie Hearts of Fire, in which he played Billy Parker, a washed-up rock star turned chicken farmer whose teenage lover (Fiona) leaves him for a jaded English synth-pop sensation played by Rupert Everett. Dylan also contributed two original songs to the soundtrack—"Night After Night", and "Had a Dream About You, Baby", as well as a cover of John Hiatt's "The Usual". The film was a critical and commercial flop.

Dylan was inducted into the Rock and Roll Hall of Fame in January 1988, with Bruce Springsteen's introduction declaring, "Bob freed your mind the way Elvis freed your body. He showed us that just because music was innately physical did not mean that it was anti-intellectual".

The album Down in the Groove in May 1988 sold even more poorly than his previous studio album. Michael Gray wrote: "The very title undercuts any idea that inspired work may lie within. Here was a further devaluing of the notion of a new Bob Dylan album as something significant." The critical and commercial disappointment of that album was swiftly followed by the success of the Traveling Wilburys. Dylan co-founded the band with George Harrison, Jeff Lynne, Roy Orbison and Tom Petty, and in late 1988 their multi-platinum Traveling Wilburys Vol. 1 reached three on the US albums chart, featuring songs that were described as Dylan's most accessible compositions in years. Despite Orbison's death in December 1988, the remaining four recorded a second album in May 1990 with the title Traveling Wilburys Vol. 3.

Dylan finished the decade on a critical high note with Oh Mercy produced by Daniel Lanois. Michael Gray wrote that the album was: "Attentively written, vocally distinctive, musically warm, and uncompromisingly professional, this cohesive whole is the nearest thing to a great Bob Dylan album in the 1980s."Dylan, pp. 145–221. The track "Most of the Time", a lost love composition, was later prominently featured in the film High Fidelity, while "What Was It You Wanted?" has been interpreted both as a catechism and a wry comment on the expectations of critics and fans. The religious imagery of "Ring Them Bells" struck some critics as a re-affirmation of faith.

1990s
Dylan's 1990s began with Under the Red Sky (1990), an about-face from the serious Oh Mercy. It contained several apparently simple songs, including "Under the Red Sky" and "Wiggle Wiggle". The album was dedicated to "Gabby Goo Goo", a nickname for the daughter of Dylan and Carolyn Dennis, Desiree Gabrielle Dennis-Dylan, who was four. Musicians on the album included George Harrison, Slash from Guns N' Roses, David Crosby, Bruce Hornsby, Stevie Ray Vaughan, and Elton John. The record received negative reviews and sold poorly.

In 1990 and 1991 Dylan was described by his biographers as drinking heavily, impairing his performances on stage.Sounes, 2001, Down The Highway: The Life Of Bob Dylan, pp. 396–398. In an interview with Rolling Stone, Dylan dismissed allegations that drinking was interfering with his music: "That's completely inaccurate. I can drink or not drink. I don't know why people would associate drinking with anything I do, really".

Defilement and remorse were themes Dylan addressed when he received a Grammy Lifetime Achievement Award from American actor Jack Nicholson in February 1991. The event coincided with the start of the Gulf War against Saddam Hussein and Dylan performed "Masters of War". He then made a short speech: "My daddy once said to me, he said, 'Son, it is possible for you to become so defiled in this world that your own mother and father will abandon you. If that happens, God will believe in your ability to mend your own ways'".Heylin (2000), pp. 664–665. The sentiment was subsequently revealed to be a quote from 19th-century German Jewish intellectual Rabbi Samson Raphael Hirsch.

Over the next few years Dylan returned to his roots with two albums covering traditional folk and blues songs: Good as I Been to You (1992) and World Gone Wrong (1993), backed solely by his acoustic guitar. Many critics and fans commented on the quiet beauty of the song "Lone Pilgrim", written by a 19th-century teacher. In November 1994 Dylan recorded two live shows for MTV Unplugged. He said his wish to perform traditional songs was overruled by Sony executives who insisted on hits. The resulting album, MTV Unplugged, included "John Brown", an unreleased 1962 song of how enthusiasm for war ends in mutilation and disillusionment.

With a collection of songs reportedly written while snowed in on his Minnesota ranch, Dylan booked recording time with Daniel Lanois at Miami's Criteria Studios in January 1997. The subsequent recording sessions were, by some accounts, fraught with musical tension. Before the album's release Dylan was hospitalized with a life-threatening heart infection, pericarditis, brought on by histoplasmosis. His scheduled European tour was canceled, but Dylan made a speedy recovery and left the hospital saying, "I really thought I'd be seeing Elvis soon". He was back on the road by mid-year, and performed before Pope John Paul II at the World Eucharistic Conference in Bologna, Italy. The Pope treated the audience of 200,000 people to a homily based on Dylan's lyric "Blowin' in the Wind".

In September Dylan released the new Lanois-produced album, Time Out of Mind. With its bitter assessment of love and morbid ruminations, Dylan's first collection of original songs in seven years was highly acclaimed. One critic wrote: "the songs themselves are uniformly powerful, adding up to Dylan's best overall collection in years". This collection of complex songs won him his first solo "Album of the Year" Grammy Award.

In December 1997, US President Bill Clinton presented Dylan with a Kennedy Center Honor in the East Room of the White House, paying this tribute: "He probably had more impact on people of my generation than any other creative artist. His voice and lyrics haven't always been easy on the ear, but throughout his career Bob Dylan has never aimed to please. He's disturbed the peace and discomforted the powerful".

2000s

Dylan commenced the 2000s by winning the Polar Music Prize in May 2000 and his first Oscar; his song "Things Have Changed", written for the film Wonder Boys, won an Academy Award for Best Song in 2001."Love and Theft" was released on September 11, 2001. Recorded with his touring band, Dylan produced the album himself under the pseudonym Jack Frost. The album was critically well received and earned nominations for several Grammy awards. Critics noted that Dylan was widening his musical palette to include rockabilly, Western swing, jazz, and even lounge ballads. "Love and Theft" generated controversy when The Wall Street Journal pointed out similarities between the album's lyrics and Japanese author Junichi Saga's book Confessions of a Yakuza.

In 2003, Dylan revisited the evangelical songs from his Christian period and participated in the CD project Gotta Serve Somebody: The Gospel Songs of Bob Dylan. That year Dylan also released the film Masked & Anonymous, which he co-wrote with director Larry Charles under the alias Sergei Petrov. Dylan played the central character in the film, Jack Fate, alongside a cast that included Jeff Bridges, Penélope Cruz and John Goodman. The film polarised critics: many dismissed it as an "incoherent mess"; a few treated it as a serious work of art.

In October 2004, Dylan published the first part of his autobiography, Chronicles: Volume One. Confounding expectations, Dylan devoted three chapters to his first year in New York City in 1961–1962, virtually ignoring the mid-1960s when his fame was at its height. He also devoted chapters to the albums New Morning (1970) and Oh Mercy (1989). The book reached number two on The New York Times' Hardcover Non-Fiction best seller list in December 2004 and was nominated for a National Book Award.No Direction Home, Martin Scorsese's acclaimed film biography of Dylan, was first broadcast on September 26–27, 2005, on BBC Two in the UK and PBS in the US. The documentary focuses on the period from Dylan's arrival in New York in 1961 to his motorcycle crash in 1966, featuring interviews with Suze Rotolo, Liam Clancy, Joan Baez, Allen Ginsberg, Pete Seeger, Mavis Staples and Dylan himself. The film received a Peabody Award in April 2006 and a Columbia-duPont Award in January 2007. The accompanying soundtrack featured unreleased songs from Dylan's early career.

Modern Times
Dylan's career as a radio presenter commenced on May 3, 2006, with his weekly radio program, Theme Time Radio Hour for XM Satellite Radio, with song selections on chosen themes. Dylan played classic and obscure records from the 1920s to the present day, including contemporary artists as diverse as Blur, Prince, L.L. Cool J and the Streets. The show was praised by fans and critics, as Dylan told stories and made eclectic references, commenting on his musical choices. In April 2009, Dylan broadcast the 100th show in his radio series; the theme was "Goodbye" and the final record played was Woody Guthrie's "So Long, It's Been Good to Know Yuh". Dylan resurrected his Theme Time Radio Hour format when he broadcast a two-hour special on the theme of "Whiskey" on Sirius Radio on September 21, 2020.

Dylan released his Modern Times album in August 2006. Despite some coarsening of Dylan's voice (a critic for The Guardian characterized his singing on the album as "a catarrhal death rattle") most reviewers praised the album, and many described it as the final installment of a successful trilogy, embracing Time Out of Mind and "Love and Theft". Modern Times entered the US charts at number one, making it Dylan's first album to reach that position since 1976's Desire. The New York Times published an article exploring similarities between some of Dylan's lyrics in Modern Times and the work of the Civil War poet Henry Timrod.

Nominated for three Grammy Awards, Modern Times won Best Contemporary Folk/Americana Album and Bob Dylan also won Best Solo Rock Vocal Performance for "Someday Baby". Modern Times was named Album of the Year, 2006, by Rolling Stone magazine, and by Uncut in the UK. On the same day that Modern Times was released the iTunes Music Store released Bob Dylan: The Collection, a digital box set containing all of his albums (773 tracks in total), along with 42 rare and unreleased tracks.

In August 2007, the award-winning film biography of Dylan I'm Not There, written and directed by Todd Haynes, was released—bearing the tagline "inspired by the music and many lives of Bob Dylan". The movie used six different actors to represent different aspects of Dylan's life: Christian Bale, Cate Blanchett, Marcus Carl Franklin, Richard Gere, Heath Ledger and Ben Whishaw. Dylan's previously unreleased 1967 recording from which the film takes its name was released for the first time on the film's original soundtrack; all other tracks are covers of Dylan songs, specially recorded for the movie by a diverse range of artists, including Sonic Youth, Eddie Vedder, Mason Jennings, Stephen Malkmus, Jeff Tweedy, Karen O, Willie Nelson, Cat Power, Richie Havens and Tom Verlaine.

On October 1, 2007, Columbia Records released the triple CD retrospective album Dylan, anthologizing his entire career under the Dylan 07 logo. The sophistication of the Dylan 07 marketing campaign was a reminder that Dylan's commercial profile had risen considerably since the 1990s. This became evident in 2004, when Dylan appeared in a TV advertisement for Victoria's Secret lingerie. Three years later, in October 2007, he participated in a multi-media campaign for the 2008 Cadillac Escalade.Dylan also devoted an hour of his Theme Time Radio Hour to the theme of "the Cadillac". He first sang about the car in his 1963 nuclear war fantasy, "Talkin' World War III Blues", when he described it as a "good car to drive—after a war". Then, in 2009, he gave the highest profile endorsement of his career, appearing with rapper will.i.am in a Pepsi ad that debuted during the telecast of Super Bowl XLIII. The ad, broadcast to a record audience of 98 million viewers, opened with Dylan singing the first verse of "Forever Young" followed by will.i.am doing a hip hop version of the song's third and final verse.The Bootleg Series Vol. 8 – Tell Tale Signs was released in October 2008, as both a two-CD set and a three-CD version with a 150-page hardcover book. The set contains live performances and outtakes from selected studio albums from Oh Mercy to Modern Times, as well as soundtrack contributions and collaborations with David Bromberg and Ralph Stanley. The pricing of the album—the two-CD set went on sale for $18.99 and the three-CD version for $129.99—led to complaints about "rip-off packaging" from some fans and commentators. The release was widely acclaimed by critics. The abundance of alternative takes and unreleased material suggested to one reviewer that this volume of old outtakes "feels like a new Bob Dylan record, not only for the astonishing freshness of the material, but also for the incredible sound quality and organic feeling of everything here".

Together Through Life and Christmas in the Heart
Bob Dylan released his album Together Through Life on April 28, 2009. In a conversation with music journalist Bill Flanagan, published on Dylan's website, Dylan explained that the genesis of the record was when French film director Olivier Dahan asked him to supply a song for his new road movie, My Own Love Song; initially only intending to record a single track, "Life Is Hard", "the record sort of took its own direction". Nine of the ten songs on the album are credited as co-written by Bob Dylan and Robert Hunter. The album received largely favorable reviews, although several critics described it as a minor addition to Dylan's canon of work. In its first week of release, the album reached number one in the Billboard 200 chart in the US, making Bob Dylan (67 years of age) the oldest artist to ever debut at number one on that chart.

Dylan's album, Christmas in the Heart, was released in October 2009, comprising such Christmas standards as "Little Drummer Boy", "Winter Wonderland" and "Here Comes Santa Claus". Critics pointed out that Dylan was "revisiting yuletide styles popularized by Nat King Cole, Mel Tormé, and the Ray Conniff Singers". Dylan's royalties from the sale of this album were donated to the charities Feeding America in the USA, Crisis in the UK, and the World Food Programme. The album received generally favorable reviews. In an interview published in The Big Issue, journalist Bill Flanagan asked Dylan why he had performed the songs in a straightforward style, and Dylan replied: "There wasn't any other way to play it. These songs are part of my life, just like folk songs. You have to play them straight too".

2010s

Tempest
Volume 9 of Dylan's Bootleg Series, The Witmark Demos was issued in October 18, 2010. It comprised 47 demo recordings of songs taped between 1962 and 1964 for Dylan's earliest music publishers: Leeds Music in 1962, and Witmark Music from 1962 to 1964. One reviewer described the set as "a hearty glimpse of young Bob Dylan changing the music business, and the world, one note at a time". The critical aggregator website Metacritic awarded the album a Metascore of 86, indicating "universal acclaim". In the same week, Sony Legacy released Bob Dylan: The Original Mono Recordings, a box set that for the first time presented Dylan's eight earliest albums, from Bob Dylan (1962) to John Wesley Harding (1967), in their original mono mix in the CD format. The CDs were housed in miniature facsimiles of the original album covers, replete with original liner notes. The set was accompanied by a booklet featuring an essay by music critic Greil Marcus.

On April 12, 2011, Legacy Recordings released Bob Dylan in Concert – Brandeis University 1963, taped at Brandeis University on May 10, 1963, two weeks before the release of The Freewheelin' Bob Dylan. The tape was discovered in the archive of music writer Ralph J. Gleason, and the recording carries liner notes by Michael Gray, who says it captures Dylan "from way back when Kennedy was President and the Beatles hadn't yet reached America. It reveals him not at any Big Moment but giving a performance like his folk club sets of the period ... This is the last live performance we have of Bob Dylan before he becomes a star".

The extent to which his work was studied at an academic level was demonstrated on Dylan's 70th birthday on May 24, 2011, when three universities organized symposia on his work. The University of Mainz, the University of Vienna, and the University of Bristol invited literary critics and cultural historians to give papers on aspects of Dylan's work. Other events, including tribute bands, discussions and simple singalongs, took place around the world, as reported in The Guardian: "From Moscow to Madrid, Norway to Northampton and Malaysia to his home state of Minnesota, self-confessed 'Bobcats' will gather today to celebrate the 70th birthday of a giant of popular music".

On May 29, 2012, US President Barack Obama awarded Dylan a Presidential Medal of Freedom in the White House. At the ceremony, Obama praised Dylan's voice for its "unique gravelly power that redefined not just what music sounded like but the message it carried and how it made people feel".

Dylan's 35th studio album, Tempest was released on September 11, 2012. The album features a tribute to John Lennon, "Roll On John", and the title track is a 14-minute song about the sinking of the Titanic. Reviewing Tempest for Rolling Stone, Will Hermes gave the album five out of five stars, writing: "Lyrically, Dylan is at the top of his game, joking around, dropping wordplay and allegories that evade pat readings and quoting other folks' words like a freestyle rapper on fire". The critical aggregator website Metacritic awarded the album a score of 83 out of 100, indicating "universal acclaim".

Volume 10 of Dylan's Bootleg Series, Another Self Portrait (1969–1971), was released in August 2013. The album contained 35 previously unreleased tracks, including alternative takes and demos from Dylan's 1969–1971 recording sessions during the making of the Self Portrait and New Morning albums. The box set also included a live recording of Dylan's performance with the Band at the Isle of Wight Festival in 1969. Another Self Portrait received favorable reviews, earning a score of 81 on the critical aggregator, Metacritic, indicating "universal acclaim". AllMusic critic Thom Jurek wrote, "For fans, this is more than a curiosity, it's an indispensable addition to the catalog".

Columbia Records released a boxed set containing all 35 Dylan studio albums, six albums of live recordings, and a collection, titled Sidetracks, of non-album material, Bob Dylan: Complete Album Collection: Vol. One, in November 2013. To publicize the 35 album box set, an innovative video of the song "Like a Rolling Stone" was released on Dylan's website. The interactive video, created by director Vania Heymann, allowed viewers to switch between 16 simulated TV channels, all featuring characters who are lip-synching the lyrics of the 48-year-old song.

Dylan appeared in a commercial for the Chrysler 200 car which was screened during the 2014 Super Bowl American football game played on February 2, 2014. At the end of the commercial, Dylan says: "So let Germany brew your beer, let Switzerland make your watch, let Asia assemble your phone. We will build your car". Dylan's Super Bowl commercial generated controversy and op-ed pieces discussing the protectionist implications of his words, and whether the singer had "sold out" to corporate interests.

In 2013 and 2014, auction house sales demonstrated the high cultural value attached to Dylan's mid-1960s work and the record prices that collectors were willing to pay for artifacts from this period. In December 2013, the Fender Stratocaster which Dylan had played at the 1965 Newport Folk Festival fetched $965,000, the second highest price paid for a guitar. In June 2014, Dylan's hand-written lyrics of "Like a Rolling Stone", his 1965 hit single, fetched $2 million at auction, a record for a popular music manuscript.

A 960-page, thirteen and a half pound edition of Dylan's lyrics, The Lyrics: Since 1962, was published by Simon & Schuster in the fall of 2014. The book was edited by literary critic Christopher Ricks, Julie Nemrow and Lisa Nemrow, to offer variant versions of Dylan's songs, sourced from out-takes and live performances. A limited edition of 50 books, signed by Dylan, was priced at $5,000. "It's the biggest, most expensive book we've ever published, as far as I know", said Jonathan Karp, Simon & Schuster's president and publisher.

A comprehensive edition of the Basement Tapes, songs recorded by Dylan and the Band in 1967, was released as The Basement Tapes Complete in November 2014. These 138 tracks in a six-CD box form Volume 11 of Dylan's Bootleg Series. The 1975 album The Basement Tapes had contained just 24 tracks from the material which Dylan and the Band had recorded at their homes in Woodstock, New York in 1967. Subsequently, over 100 recordings and alternate takes had circulated on bootleg records. The sleeve notes for the new box set are by Sid Griffin, author of Million Dollar Bash: Bob Dylan, the Band, and the Basement Tapes. The box set earned a score of 99 on the critical aggregator, Metacritic.

Shadows in the Night, Fallen Angels and Triplicate
In February 2015, Dylan released Shadows in the Night, featuring ten songs written between 1923 and 1963, which have been described as part of the Great American Songbook. All of the songs on the album had been recorded by Frank Sinatra, but both critics and Dylan himself cautioned against seeing the record as a collection of "Sinatra covers". Dylan explained: "I don't see myself as covering these songs in any way. They've been covered enough. Buried, as a matter a fact. What me and my band are basically doing is uncovering them. Lifting them out of the grave and bringing them into the light of day". Shadows In the Night received favorable reviews, scoring 82 on the critical aggregator Metacritic, which indicates "universal acclaim". Critics praised the restrained instrumental backings and the quality of Dylan's singing. The album debuted at number one in the UK Albums Chart in its first week of release.The Bootleg Series Vol. 12: The Cutting Edge 1965–1966, consisting of previously unreleased material from the three albums Dylan recorded between January 1965 and March 1966: Bringing It All Back Home, Highway 61 Revisited and Blonde on Blonde was released in November 2015. The set was released in three formats: a 2-CD "Best Of" version, a 6-CD "Deluxe edition", and an 18-CD "Collector's Edition" in a limited edition of 5,000 units. On Dylan's website the "Collector's Edition" was described as containing "every single note recorded by Bob Dylan in the studio in 1965/1966". The critical aggregator website Metacritic awarded Cutting Edge a score of 99, indicating "universal acclaim". The Best of the Cutting Edge entered the Billboard Top Rock Albums chart at number one on November 18, based on its first-week sales.

The sale of Dylan's extensive archive of about 6,000 items of memorabilia to the George Kaiser Family Foundation and the University of Tulsa (TU) was announced on March 2, 2016. It was reported the sale price was "an estimated $15 million to $20 million". The archive comprises notebooks, drafts of Dylan lyrics, recordings, and correspondence. The archive will be housed at Helmerich Center for American Research, a facility at the Gilcrease Museum.

Dylan released Fallen Angels—described as "a direct continuation of the work of 'uncovering' the Great Songbook that he began on last year's Shadows In the Night"—in May. The album contained twelve songs by classic songwriters such as Harold Arlen, Sammy Cahn and Johnny Mercer, eleven of which had been recorded by Sinatra. Jim Farber wrote in Entertainment Weekly: "Tellingly, [Dylan] delivers these songs of love lost and cherished not with a burning passion but with the wistfulness of experience. They're memory songs now, intoned with a present sense of commitment. Released just four days ahead of his 75th birthday, they couldn't be more age-appropriate". The album received a score of 79 on critical aggregator website Metacritic, denoting "generally favorable reviews".

A massive 36-CD collection, The 1966 Live Recordings, including every known recording of Bob Dylan's 1966 concert tour was released in November 2016. The recordings commence with the concert in White Plains New York on February 5, 1966, and end with the Royal Albert Hall concert in London on May 27. The New York Times reported most of the concerts had "never been heard in any form", and described the set as "a monumental addition to the corpus".

Dylan released a triple album of a further 30 recordings of classic American songs, Triplicate, in March 2017. Dylan's 38th studio album was recorded in Hollywood's Capitol Studios and features his touring band. Dylan posted a long interview on his website to promote the album, and was asked if this material was an exercise in nostalgia. "Nostalgic? No I wouldn't say that. It's not taking a trip down memory lane or longing and yearning for the good old days or fond memories of what's no more. A song like "Sentimental Journey" is not a way back when song, it doesn't emulate the past, it's attainable and down to earth, it's in the here and now." The album was awarded a score of 84 on critical aggregator website Metacritic, signifying "universal acclaim". Critics praised the thoroughness of Dylan's exploration of the great American songbook, though, in the opinion of Uncut: "For all its easy charms, Triplicate labours its point to the brink of overkill. After five albums' worth of croon toons, this feels like a fat full stop on a fascinating chapter".

The next edition of Dylan's Bootleg Series revisited Dylan's "Born Again" Christian period of 1979 to 1981, which was described by Rolling Stone as "an intense, wildly controversial time that produced three albums and some of the most confrontational concerts of his long career". Reviewing the box set The Bootleg Series Vol. 13: Trouble No More 1979–1981, comprising 8 CDs and 1 DVD, Jon Pareles wrote in The New York Times: "Decades later, what comes through these recordings above all is Mr. Dylan's unmistakable fervor, his sense of mission. The studio albums are subdued, even tentative, compared with what the songs became on the road. Mr. Dylan's voice is clear, cutting and ever improvisational; working the crowds, he was emphatic, committed, sometimes teasingly combative. And the band tears into the music". Trouble No More includes a DVD of a film directed by Jennifer Lebeau consisting of live footage of Dylan's gospel performances interspersed with sermons delivered by actor Michael Shannon. The box set album received an aggregate score of 84 on the critical website Metacritic, indicating "universal acclaim".

Dylan made a contribution to the compilation EP Universal Love, a collection of reimagined wedding songs for the LGBT community in April 2018. The album was funded by MGM Resorts International and the songs are intended to function as "wedding anthems for same-sex couples". Dylan recorded the 1929 song "She's Funny That Way", changing the gender pronoun to "He's Funny That Way". The song was previously recorded by Billie Holiday and Frank Sinatra.

Also in April 2018, The New York Times announced that Dylan was launching Heaven's Door, a range of three whiskeys: a straight rye, a straight bourbon and a "double-barreled" whiskey. Dylan has been involved in both the creation and the marketing of the range. The Times described the venture as "Mr. Dylan's entry into the booming celebrity-branded spirits market, the latest career twist for an artist who has spent five decades confounding expectations".

On November 2, 2018, Dylan released More Blood, More Tracks as Volume 14 in the Bootleg Series. The set comprises all Dylan's recordings for his 1975 album Blood On the Tracks, and was issued as a single CD and also as a six-CD Deluxe Edition. The box set album received an aggregate score of 93 on the critical website Metacritic, indicating "universal acclaim".

Netflix released the movie Rolling Thunder Revue: A Bob Dylan Story by Martin Scorsese on June 12, 2019, describing the film as "Part documentary, part concert film, part fever dream". The Scorsese film received an aggregate score of 88 on critical website Metacritic, indicating "universal acclaim". The film sparked controversy because of the way it deliberately mixed documentary footage filmed during the Rolling Thunder Revue in the fall of 1975 with fictitious characters and invented stories.

Coinciding with the film release, a box set of 14 CDs, The Rolling Thunder Revue: The 1975 Live Recordings, was released by Columbia Records. The set comprises five full Dylan performances from the tour and recently discovered tapes from Dylan's tour rehearsals. The box set received an aggregate score of 89 on the critical website Metacritic, indicating "universal acclaim".

The next installment of Dylan's Bootleg Series, Bob Dylan (featuring Johnny Cash) – Travelin' Thru, 1967 – 1969: The Bootleg Series Vol. 15, was released on November 1. The 3-CD set comprises outtakes from Dylan's albums John Wesley Harding and Nashville Skyline, and songs that Dylan recorded with Johnny Cash in Nashville in 1969 and with Earl Scruggs in 1970. Travelin' Thru received an aggregate score of 88 on the critical website Metacritic, indicating "universal acclaim".

2020s
Rough and Rowdy Ways

On March 26, 2020, Dylan released a seventeen-minute track "Murder Most Foul" on his YouTube channel, revolving around the assassination of President Kennedy. Dylan posted a statement: "This is an unreleased song we recorded a while back that you might find interesting. Stay safe, stay observant and may God be with you". Billboard reported on April 8 that "Murder Most Foul" had topped the Billboard Rock Digital Song Sales Chart. This was the first time that Dylan had scored a number one song on a pop chart under his own name. Three weeks later, on April 17, 2020, Dylan released another new song, "I Contain Multitudes". The title is a quote from Section 51 of Walt Whitman's poem "Song of Myself". On May 7, Dylan released a third single, "False Prophet", accompanied by the news that "Murder Most Foul", "I Contain Multitudes" and "False Prophet" would all appear on a forthcoming double album.Rough and Rowdy Ways, Dylan's 39th studio album and his first album of original material since 2012, was released on June 19 to favorable reviews. Alexis Petridis wrote in The Guardian, "For all its bleakness, Rough and Rowdy Ways might well be Bob Dylan's most consistently brilliant set of songs in years: the die-hards can spend months unravelling the knottier lyrics, but you don't need a PhD in Dylanology to appreciate its singular quality and power". Rolling Stone critic Rob Sheffield wrote: "While the world keeps trying to celebrate him as an institution, pin him down, cast him in the Nobel Prize canon, embalm his past, this drifter always keeps on making his next escape. On Rough and Rowdy Ways, Dylan is exploring terrain nobody else has reached before—yet he just keeps pushing on into the future". Critical aggregator Metacritic gave the album a score of 95, indicating "universal acclaim". In its first week of release Rough and Rowdy Ways reached number one on the UK album chart, making Dylan "the oldest artist to score a No. 1 of new, original material".

In December 2020, it was announced that Dylan had sold his entire song catalog to Universal Music Publishing Group. Dylan's deal includes 100 percent of his rights for all the songs of his catalog, including both the income he receives as a songwriter and his control of each song's copyright. In exchange for its payment to Dylan, Universal, a division of the French media conglomerate Vivendi, will collect all future income from the songs. The New York Times stated Universal had purchased the copyright to over 600 songs and the price was "estimated at more than $300 million", although other reports suggested the figure was closer to $400 million.

On February 26, 2021, Columbia Records released 1970, a three-CD set of recordings from the Self Portrait and New Morning sessions, including the entirety of the session Dylan recorded with George Harrison on May 1, 1970.

Dylan's 80th birthday in May 2021 was commemorated by a virtual conference, Dylan@80, organized by the TU Institute for Bob Dylan Studies. The program featured seventeen sessions spread across three days delivered by over fifty scholars, journalists and musicians, contributing from around the world through internet connections. Several new biographies and studies of Dylan were published as journalists and critics assessed the scale of Dylan's achievements in a career spanning 60 years.

Livestream platform Veeps presented a 50 minute performance by Dylan, Shadow Kingdom: The Early Songs of Bob Dylan, in July 2021. Filmed in black and white with a film noir look, Dylan performed 13 songs in a club setting with an audience. The performance was favorably reviewed, and one critic suggested the backing band resembled the style of the musical Girl from the North Country.

On September 17, Dylan released Springtime In New York: The Bootleg Series Vol. 16 (1980–1985), issued in 2 LP, 2 CD and 5 CD formats. The set comprised rehearsals, live recordings, out-takes and alternative takes from the albums Shot of Love, Infidels and Empire Burlesque. In The Daily Telegraph, Neil McCormick commented: "These bootleg sessions remind us that Dylan's worst period is still more interesting than most artists' purple patches". Springtime in New York received an aggregate score of 85 on Metacritic, indicating "universal acclaim".

On July 7, 2022, Christie’s, London, auctioned a new (2021) recording by Dylan of his song “Blowin’ in the Wind”. The record was in an innovative “one of one” recording medium, branded as Ionic Original, which producer T Bone Burnett claimed “surpasses the sonic excellence and depth for which analogue sound is renowned, while at the same time boasting the durability of a digital recording.”  
The recording fetched GBP £1,482,000—equivalent to $1,769,508.

Dylan published The Philosophy of Modern Song on November 1, 2022, a book containing 66 essays on songs by other artists. The New Yorker described the work as “a rich, riffy, funny, and completely engaging book of essays”. Other reviewers praised the book’s eclectic outlook, while some questioned its variations in style and dearth of female songwriters.

Dylan released The Bootleg Series Vol. 17: Fragments - Time Out Of Mind Sessions (1996-1997) on January 27, 2023, in multiple formats. The 5-CD version comprised: a re-mix of the 1997 album "to sound more like how the songs came across when the musicians originally played them in the room" without the effects and processing which producer Daniel Lanois applied later; 25 previously unreleased out-takes from the studio sessions; and a disc of live performances of each song on the album performed by Dylan and his band in concert.

Never Ending Tour

The Never Ending Tour commenced on June 7, 1988. Dylan has played roughly 100 dates a year since, a heavier schedule than most performers who started in the 1960s. By April 2019, Dylan and his band had played more than 3,000 shows, anchored by long-time bassist Tony Garnier and multi-instrumentalist Donnie Herron. In November 2021, drummer Charley Drayton joined the band.

In September 2021, Dylan's touring company announced a series of tours which were billed as the "Rough and Rowdy Ways World Wide Tour, 2021–2024". Dylan’s website announced in July 2022 a tour of Europe, commencing in Oslo, Norway, on September 25, and ending in Dublin, Ireland on November 7.

To the dismay of some of his audience, Dylan's performances are unpredictable as he often alters his arrangements and changes his vocal approach. Critical opinion about the shows is divided. Critics such as Richard Williams and Andy Gill have argued that Dylan has found a successful way to present his rich legacy of material. Others have criticized his live performances for changing "the greatest lyrics ever written so that they are effectively unrecognisable", and giving so little to the audience that "it is difficult to understand what he is doing on stage at all".

Visual art
Dylan's visual art was first seen by the public via a painting he contributed for the cover of The Band's Music from Big Pink album in 1968. The cover of Dylan's own 1970 album Self Portrait features the painting of a human face by Dylan. More of Dylan's artwork was revealed with the 1973 publication of his book Writings and Drawings. The cover of Dylan's 1974 album Planet Waves again featured one of his paintings. In 1994 Random House published Drawn Blank, a book of Dylan's drawings. In 2007, the first public exhibition of Dylan's paintings, The Drawn Blank Series, opened at the Kunstsammlungen in Chemnitz, Germany; it showcased more than 200 watercolors and gouaches made from the original drawings. The exhibition coincided with the publication of Bob Dylan: The Drawn Blank Series, which includes 170 reproductions from the series. From September 2010 until April 2011, the National Gallery of Denmark exhibited 40 large-scale acrylic paintings by Dylan, The Brazil Series.

In July 2011, a leading contemporary art gallery, Gagosian Gallery, announced their representation of Dylan's paintings. An exhibition of Dylan's art, The Asia Series, opened at the Gagosian Madison Avenue Gallery on September 20, displaying Dylan's paintings of scenes in China and the Far East. The New York Times reported that "some fans and Dylanologists have raised questions about whether some of these paintings are based on the singer's own experiences and observations, or on photographs that are widely available and were not taken by Mr. Dylan". The Times pointed to close resemblances between Dylan's paintings and historic photos of Japan and China, and photos taken by Dmitri Kessel and Henri Cartier-Bresson. Art critic Blake Gopnik has defended Dylan's artistic practice, arguing: "Ever since the birth of photography, painters have used it as the basis for their works: Edgar Degas and Édouard Vuillard and other favorite artists—even Edvard Munch—all took or used photos as sources for their art, sometimes barely altering them". The Magnum photo agency confirmed that Dylan had licensed the reproduction rights of these photographs.

Dylan's second show at the Gagosian Gallery, Revisionist Art, opened in November 2012. The show consisted of thirty paintings, transforming and satirizing popular magazines, including Playboy and Babytalk. In February 2013, Dylan exhibited the New Orleans Series of paintings at the Palazzo Reale in Milan. In August 2013, Britain's National Portrait Gallery in London hosted Dylan's first major UK exhibition, Face Value, featuring twelve pastel portraits.

In November 2013, the Halcyon Gallery in London mounted Mood Swings, an exhibition in which Dylan displayed seven wrought iron gates he had made. In a statement released by the gallery, Dylan said, "I've been around iron all my life ever since I was a kid. I was born and raised in iron ore country, where you could breathe it and smell it every day. Gates appeal to me because of the negative space they allow. They can be closed but at the same time they allow the seasons and breezes to enter and flow. They can shut you out or shut you in. And in some ways there is no difference".

In November 2016, the Halcyon Gallery featured a collection of drawings, watercolors and acrylic works by Dylan. The exhibition, The Beaten Path, depicted American landscapes and urban scenes, inspired by Dylan's travels across the USA. The show was reviewed by Vanity Fair and Asia Times Online. In October 2018, the Halcyon Gallery mounted an exhibition of Dylan's drawings, Mondo Scripto. The works consisted of Dylan hand-written lyrics of his songs, with each song illustrated by a drawing.Retrospectrum, the largest retrospective of Dylan's visual art to date, consisting of over 250 works in a variety of media, debuted at the Modern Art Museum in Shanghai in 2019. Building on the exhibition in China, a version of Retrospectrum, which includes a new series of paintings, "Deep Focus", drawn from film imagery, opened at the Frost Art Museum in Miami on November 30, 2021.

Since 1994, Dylan has published nine books of paintings and drawings. In November 2022, Dylan apologised for using an autopen to sign books and artwork which were subsequently sold as "hand-signed" since 2019.

Discography

 Bob Dylan (1962)
 The Freewheelin' Bob Dylan (1963)
 The Times They Are a-Changin' (1964)
 Another Side of Bob Dylan (1964)
 Bringing It All Back Home (1965)
 Highway 61 Revisited (1965)
 Blonde on Blonde (1966)
 John Wesley Harding (1967)
 Nashville Skyline (1969)
 Self Portrait (1970)
 New Morning (1970)
 Pat Garrett & Billy the Kid (1973)
 Dylan (1973)
 Planet Waves (1974)
 Blood on the Tracks (1975)
 The Basement Tapes (1975)
 Desire (1976)
 Street-Legal (1978)
 Slow Train Coming (1979)
 Saved (1980)
 Shot of Love (1981)
 Infidels (1983)
 Empire Burlesque (1985)
 Knocked Out Loaded (1986)
 Down in the Groove (1988)
 Oh Mercy (1989)
 Under the Red Sky (1990)
 Good as I Been to You (1992)
 World Gone Wrong (1993)
 Time Out of Mind (1997)
 "Love and Theft" (2001)
 Modern Times (2006)
 Together Through Life (2009)
 Christmas in the Heart (2009)
 Tempest (2012)
 Shadows in the Night (2015)
 Fallen Angels (2016)
 Triplicate (2017)
 Rough and Rowdy Ways (2020)

Bibliography

Dylan has published Tarantula, a work of prose poetry; Chronicles: Volume One, the first part of his memoirs; several books of the lyrics of his songs, and eight books of his art. Dylan's third full length book, The Philosophy of Modern Song, which contains 66 essays on songs by other artists, was published on November 1, 2022. Dylan has also been the subject of numerous biographies and critical studies.

Personal life

Romantic relationships
Suze Rotolo
Dylan's first serious relationship was with artist Suze Rotolo, a daughter of Communist Party USA radicals. According to Dylan, "She was the most erotic thing I'd ever seen ... The air was suddenly filled with banana leaves. We started talking and my head started to spin". Rotolo was photographed arm-in-arm with Dylan on the cover of his album The Freewheelin' Bob Dylan. Critics have connected Rotolo to some of Dylan's early love songs, including "Don't Think Twice It's All Right". The relationship ended in 1964. In 2008, Rotolo published a memoir about her life in Greenwich Village and relationship with Dylan in the 1960s, A Freewheelin' Time.

Joan Baez
When Joan Baez first met Dylan in April 1961, she had already released her first album and was acclaimed as the "Queen of Folk". On hearing Dylan perform his song "With God on Our Side", Baez later said, "I never thought anything so powerful could come out of that little toad". In July 1963, Baez invited Dylan to join her on stage at the Newport Folk Festival, setting the scene for similar duets over the next two years. By the time of Dylan's 1965 tour of the U.K, their romantic relationship had begun to fizzle out, as captured in D. A. Pennebaker's documentary film Dont Look Back. Baez later toured with Dylan as a performer on his Rolling Thunder Revue in 1975–76. Baez also starred as "The Woman In White" in the film Renaldo and Clara (1978), directed by Dylan and filmed during the Rolling Thunder Revue. Dylan and Baez toured together again in 1984 with Carlos Santana.

Baez recalled her relationship with Dylan in Martin Scorsese's documentary film No Direction Home (2005). Baez wrote about Dylan in two autobiographies—admiringly in Daybreak (1968), and less admiringly in And A Voice to Sing With (1987). Baez portrayed her relationship with Dylan in her song "Diamonds & Rust", which has been described as "an acute portrait" of Dylan.

Sara Lownds
Dylan married Sara Lownds, who had worked as a model and a secretary at Drew Associates, on November 22, 1965. Their first child, Jesse Byron Dylan, was born on January 6, 1966, and they had three more children: Anna Lea (born July 11, 1967), Samuel Isaac Abram (born July 30, 1968), and Jakob Luke (born December 9, 1969). Dylan also adopted Sara's daughter from a prior marriage, Maria Lownds (later Dylan, born October 21, 1961). Sara Dylan played the role of Clara in Dylan's film Renaldo and Clara (1978). Bob and Sara Dylan were divorced on June 29, 1977.

Jakob became well known as the lead singer of the band the Wallflowers in the 1990s. Jesse is a film director and business executive.

Carolyn Dennis
Dylan and his backup singer Carolyn Dennis (often professionally known as Carol Dennis) have a daughter, Desiree Gabrielle Dennis-Dylan, born on January 31, 1986. The couple were married on June 4, 1986, and divorced in October 1992. Their marriage and child remained a closely guarded secret until the publication of Howard Sounes's biography Down the Highway: The Life of Bob Dylan, in 2001.

Home
When not touring, Dylan is believed to live primarily in Point Dume, a promontory on the coast of Malibu, California, though he also owns property around the world.

Religious beliefs
Growing up in Hibbing, Minnesota, Dylan and his family were part of the area's small, close-knit Jewish community, and Dylan had his Bar Mitzvah in May 1954. Around the time of his 30th birthday, in 1971, Dylan visited Israel, and also met Rabbi Meir Kahane, founder of the New York-based Jewish Defense League.

In the late 1970s, Dylan converted to Christianity. In November 1978, guided by his friend Mary Alice Artes, Dylan made contact with the Vineyard School of Discipleship. Vineyard Pastor Kenn Gulliksen has recalled: "Larry Myers and Paul Emond went over to Bob's house and ministered to him. He responded by saying yes, he did in fact want Christ in his life. And he prayed that day and received the Lord".Gray, 2006, The Bob Dylan Encyclopedia, pp. 76–80. From January to March 1979, Dylan attended Vineyard's Bible study classes in Reseda, California.Heylin, 1996, Bob Dylan: A Life In Stolen Moments, p. 206.

By 1984, Dylan was distancing himself from the "born again" label. He told Kurt Loder of Rolling Stone: "I've never said I'm 'born again'. That's just a media term. I don't think I've been an agnostic. I've always thought there's a superior power, that this is not the real world and that there's a world to come." In 1997, he told David Gates of Newsweek:

Dylan has supported the Chabad Lubavitch movement, and has privately participated in Jewish religious events, including his sons' Bar Mitzvahs and services at Hadar Hatorah, a Chabad Lubavitch yeshiva. In 1989 and 1991, he appeared on the Chabad telethon.

Dylan has continued to perform songs from his gospel albums in concert, occasionally covering traditional religious songs. He has made passing references to his religious faith, such as in a 2004 interview with 60 Minutes, when he told Ed Bradley, "the only person you have to think twice about lying to is either yourself or to God". He explained his constant touring schedule as part of a bargain he made a long time ago with the "chief commander—in this earth and in the world we can't see".

Speaking to Jeff Slate of The Wall Street Journal in December 2022, Dylan reaffirmed his religious outlook: "I read the scriptures a lot, meditate and pray, light candles in church. I believe in damnation and salvation as well as predestination. The Five Books of Moses, Pauline Epistles, Invocation of the Saints, all of it."

Accolades

Dylan has won many awards throughout his career including the 2016 Nobel Prize in Literature, ten Grammy Awards, one Academy Award and one Golden Globe Award. He has been inducted into the Rock and Roll Hall of Fame, Nashville Songwriters Hall of Fame, and Songwriters Hall of Fame. In May 2000, Dylan received the Polar Music Prize from Sweden's King Carl XVI.

In June 2007, Dylan received the Prince of Asturias Award in the Arts category. Dylan received the Presidential Medal of Freedom in May 2012. In February 2015, Dylan accepted the MusiCares Person of the Year award from the National Academy of Recording Arts and Sciences, in recognition of his philanthropic and artistic contributions to society. In November 2013, Dylan received the accolade of Légion d'Honneur from the French education minister Aurélie Filippetti.

Nobel Prize in Literature

The Nobel Prize committee announced on October 13, 2016, that it would be awarding Dylan the Nobel Prize in Literature "for having created new poetic expressions within the great American song tradition". The award was not without controversy, and The New York Times reported: "Mr. Dylan, 75, is the first musician to win the award, and his selection on Thursday is perhaps the most radical choice in a history stretching back to 1901." Dylan remained silent for days after receiving the award, and then told journalist Edna Gundersen that getting the award was "amazing, incredible. Whoever dreams about something like that?" Dylan's Nobel Lecture was posted on the Nobel Prize website on June 5, 2017. 

Legacy

Dylan has been described as one of the most influential figures of the 20th century, musically and culturally. He was included in the Time 100: The Most Important People of the Century, where he was called "master poet, caustic social critic and intrepid, guiding spirit of the counterculture generation". In 2008, the Pulitzer Prize jury awarded him a special citation for "his profound impact on popular music and American culture, marked by lyrical compositions of extraordinary poetic power".
President Barack Obama said of Dylan in 2012: "There is not a bigger giant in the history of American music." For 20 years, academics lobbied the Swedish Academy to give Dylan the Nobel Prize in Literature. He received the award in 2016, making Dylan the first musician awarded the Literature Prize. Horace Engdahl, a member of the Nobel Committee, described Dylan's place in literary history:Rolling Stone has ranked Dylan at number one in its 2015 list of the 100 Greatest Songwriters of All Time, and listed "Like A Rolling Stone" as the "Greatest Song of all Time" in their 2011 list. In 2008, it was estimated that Dylan had sold about 120 million albums worldwide.

Initially modeling his writing style on the songs of Woody Guthrie, the blues of Robert Johnson, and what he termed the "architectural forms" of Hank Williams songs, Dylan added increasingly sophisticated lyrical techniques to the folk music of the early 1960s, infusing it "with the intellectualism of classic literature and poetry". Paul Simon suggested that Dylan's early compositions virtually took over the folk genre: "[Dylan's] early songs were very rich ... with strong melodies. 'Blowin' in the Wind' has a really strong melody. He so enlarged himself through the folk background that he incorporated it for a while. He defined the genre for a while".

When Dylan made his move from acoustic folk and blues music to a rock backing, the mix became more complex. For many critics, his greatest achievement was the cultural synthesis exemplified by his mid-1960s trilogy of albums—Bringing It All Back Home, Highway 61 Revisited and Blonde on Blonde. In Mike Marqusee's words:

Dylan's lyrics began to receive detailed scrutiny from academics and poets as early as 1998, when Stanford University sponsored the first international academic conference on Bob Dylan held in the United States. In 2004, Richard F. Thomas, Classics professor at Harvard University, created a freshman seminar titled "Dylan", which aimed "to put the artist in context of not just popular culture of the last half-century, but the tradition of classical poets like Virgil and Homer".

Literary critic Christopher Ricks published Dylan's Visions of Sin, a 500-page analysis of Dylan's work, and has said: "I'd not have written a book about Dylan, to stand alongside my books on Milton and Keats, Tennyson and T.S. Eliot, if I didn't think Dylan a genius of and with language".

Former British poet laureate Andrew Motion suggested his lyrics should be studied in schools. The critical consensus that Dylan's songwriting was his outstanding creative achievement was articulated by Encyclopædia Britannica, where his entry stated: "Hailed as the Shakespeare of his generation, Dylan ... set the standard for lyric writing."

Dylan's voice also received critical attention. Robert Shelton described his early vocal style as "a rusty voice suggesting Guthrie's old performances, etched in gravel like Dave Van Ronk's". David Bowie, in his tribute "Song for Bob Dylan", described Dylan's singing as "a voice like sand and glue". His voice continued to develop as he began to work with rock'n'roll backing bands; critic Michael Gray described the sound of Dylan's vocal work on "Like a Rolling Stone" as "at once young and jeeringly cynical". As Dylan's voice aged during the 1980s, for some critics, it became more expressive. Christophe Lebold writes in the journal Oral Tradition: "Dylan's more recent broken voice enables him to present a world view at the sonic surface of the songs—this voice carries us across the landscape of a broken, fallen world. The anatomy of a broken world in 'Everything is Broken' (on the album Oh Mercy) is but an example of how the thematic concern with all things broken is grounded in a concrete sonic reality".

Dylan is considered a seminal influence on many musical genres. As Edna Gundersen stated in USA Today: "Dylan's musical DNA has informed nearly every simple twist of pop since 1962". Punk musician Joe Strummer praised Dylan for having "laid down the template for lyric, tune, seriousness, spirituality, depth of rock music". 
Other major musicians who acknowledged Dylan's importance include Johnny Cash, Jerry Garcia, John Lennon, Paul McCartney, Pete Townshend, Neil Young, Bruce Springsteen, David Bowie, 
Bryan Ferry, 
Nick Cave, Patti Smith, Syd Barrett, Joni Mitchell, Tom Waits and Leonard Cohen. 
Dylan significantly contributed to the initial success of both the Byrds and the Band: the Byrds achieved chart success with their version of "Mr. Tambourine Man" and the subsequent album, while the Band were Dylan's backing band on his 1966 tour, recorded The Basement Tapes with him in 1967 and featured three previously unreleased Dylan songs on their debut album.

Some critics have dissented from the view of Dylan as a visionary figure in popular music. In his book Awopbopaloobop Alopbamboom, Nik Cohn objected: "I can't take the vision of Dylan as seer, as teenage messiah, as everything else he's been worshipped as. The way I see him, he's a minor talent with a major gift for self-hype". Australian critic Jack Marx credited Dylan with changing the persona of the rock star: "What cannot be disputed is that Dylan invented the arrogant, faux-cerebral posturing that has been the dominant style in rock since, with everyone from Mick Jagger to Eminem educating themselves from the Dylan handbook".

Fellow musicians have also presented differing views. Joni Mitchell described Dylan as a "plagiarist" and his voice as "fake" in a 2010 interview in the Los Angeles Times. Mitchell's comments led to discussions on Dylan's use of other people's material, both supporting and criticizing him. Talking to Mikal Gilmore in Rolling Stone in 2012, Dylan responded to the allegation of plagiarism, including his use of Henry Timrod's verse in his album Modern Times, by saying that it was "part of the tradition".Dylan told Gilmore: "As far as Henry Timrod is concerned, have you even heard of him? Who's been reading him lately? And who's pushed him to the forefront? ... And if you think it's so easy to quote him and it can help your work, do it yourself and see how far you can get. Wussies and pussies complain about that stuff. It's an old thing—it's part of the tradition."

If Dylan's work in the 1960s was seen as bringing intellectual ambition to popular music, critics in the 21st century described him as a figure who had greatly expanded the folk culture from which he initially emerged. Following the release of Todd Haynes' Dylan biopic I'm Not There, J. Hoberman wrote in his 2007 Village Voice'' review:

Archives and honors
 
Dylan's archive, comprising notebooks, song drafts, business contracts, recordings and movie out-takes, was purchased in 2016 by the George Kaiser Family Foundation, which had also acquired the papers of Woody Guthrie. To house the Archive, The Bob Dylan Center in Tulsa, Oklahoma opened on May 10, 2022.

In 2005, 7th Avenue East in Hibbing, Minnesota, the street on which Dylan lived from ages 6 to 18, received the honorary name Bob Dylan Drive. In 2006, a cultural pathway, Bob Dylan Way, was inaugurated in Duluth, Minnesota, where Dylan was born. The 1.8-mile path links "cultural and historically significant areas of downtown for the tourists".

In 2015, a 160-foot-wide Dylan mural by Brazilian street artist Eduardo Kobra was unveiled in downtown Minneapolis.

Notes

References

Citations

Sources

External links

 
 Expecting Rain – Dylan news and events, updated daily
 BobLinks – Comprehensive log of concerts and set lists
 Bjorner's Still on the Road – Information on recording sessions and performances
 
 

 
1941 births
20th-century American guitarists
20th-century American singers
20th-century American writers
21st-century American guitarists
21st-century American singers
21st-century American writers
Album-cover and concert-poster artists
American acoustic guitarists
American blues guitarists
American blues singers
American country guitarists
American country singer-songwriters
American folk guitarists
American folk rock musicians
American folk singers
American gospel singers
American harmonica players
American jazz singers
American male guitarists
American male singer-songwriters
American multi-instrumentalists
American Nobel laureates
American people of Lithuanian-Jewish descent
American people of Turkish-Jewish descent
American people of Ukrainian-Jewish descent
American radio DJs
American rock guitarists
American rock songwriters
Articles containing video clips
Artists from Minnesota
Asylum Records artists
Best Original Song Academy Award-winning songwriters
Columbia Records artists
Commandeurs of the Ordre des Arts et des Lettres
Converts to Christianity from Judaism
Country musicians from Minnesota
Folk musicians from New York (state)
Golden Globe Award-winning musicians
Grammy Award winners
Grammy Lifetime Achievement Award winners
Guitarists from California
Guitarists from Minnesota
Guitarists from New York City
Jewish American musicians
Jewish American poets
Jewish American songwriters
Jewish folk singers
Jewish jazz musicians
Jewish rock musicians
Jews and Judaism in Minnesota
Kennedy Center honorees
Living people
Musicians from Duluth, Minnesota
Nobel laureates in Literature
Officiers of the Légion d'honneur
People from Hibbing, Minnesota
People from Malibu, California
People from Woodstock, New York
Political music artists
Presidential Medal of Freedom recipients
Pulitzer Prize winners
Singer-songwriters from California
Singer-songwriters from Minnesota
Singers from New York City
Sony Music Publishing artists
Traditional pop music singers
Traveling Wilburys members
United States National Medal of Arts recipients
University of Minnesota alumni
Hibbing High School alumni
Jazz musicians from California
Jazz musicians from New York (state)
Singer-songwriters from New York (state)
American Christians